Marian Hannah Winter (1910 – 15 December 1981) was an American dance historian. She has been called one of "the [two] foremost names in American dance history."

In the 1940s, dance historian Lincoln Kirstein solicited Winter to write for Dance Index, a magazine he headed. In contrast to Kirstein's analytical or polemical approach to history, Winter was more of an archivist.

One of Winter's most influential works is "Juba and American Minstrelsy", published in 1947. The article sketches the life of Master Juba, a black American dancer active in the mid-19th century. Winter argues that Juba introduced African elements to American dance forms and, in the process, created a new, distinctly American style. The article thus attempts to "[re-appropriate] for black culture what is otherwise generally seen as racist theft."

Winter moved to France in her later years. There, she published The Theater of the Marvels in both English- and French-language editions. She died in Paris.

Notes

References
 Johnson, Stephen (1999). "Past the Documents, to the Dance: The Witness to Juba in 1848", on The Juba Project. Originally published in The Performance Text. Legal Press. Online version accessed March 28, 2008.
Kisselgoff, Anna (February 2, 1986). "Dance View; Dance History Is Mostly a European Affair", The New York Times. Accessed March 28, 2008.

External links

1910 births
1981 deaths
American women historians
20th-century American historians
20th-century American women writers